Scott Jamieson (born 28 November 1983) is a Scottish professional golfer who plays on the European Tour.

Amateur career
Jamieson was born in Glasgow, Scotland. He spent four years playing amateur golf on a scholarship at Augusta State University. His amateur career culminated with him representing Scotland in the 2006 Eisenhower Trophy, turning professional later the same year.

Professional career
After a slow start to his professional career, Jamieson won twice on the third-tier PGA EuroPro Tour in 2009, on his way to topping the Order of Merit; he also recorded four top-20 finishes on the Challenge Tour toward the end of the year, playing off invitations. Jamieson's 2009 performance earned him full Challenge Tour status for 2010, and he produced another successful season: top-20 finishes in his final six tournaments, including a runner-up placing in the Kazakhstan Open, boosted him to 14th in the rankings, and promotion to the European Tour.

Jamieson's rookie year on the European Tour got off to a quick start, as he recorded top-10 finishes in two of his first six tournaments, the Joburg Open in January and the Sicilian Open in March. He then embarked on a golden summer, recording his best European Tour finish with a 3rd place in the Open de España, then matching it in the BMW International Open and the Barclays Scottish Open. The latter of these gave Jamieson his largest payday to date, and qualified him for the first major of his career, the 2011 Open Championship.

Jamieson won for the first time on tour at The Nelson Mandela Championship in December 2012, the first event of the 2013 season. In a tournament heavily affected by rain, with par reduced to 65 and only two rounds possible, he pipped Steve Webster and Eduardo de la Riva on the second hole of a playoff. A month later, he led Volvo Golf Champions by 5 strokes after 3 rounds, but failed to win his second European Tour title, finished 2nd, one stroke behind Louis Oosthuizen.

After finishing runner-up to Branden Grace at the 2017 Nedbank Golf Challenge, where he pocketed more than €700,000, Jamieson finished a career-best 26th on the European Tour Race to Dubai and, that winter, he relocated to Florida with his wife, Natalie, and two children.

Amateur wins
2001 Scottish Boys Strokeplay Championship

Professional wins (3)

European Tour wins (1)

*Note: The 2012 Nelson Mandela Championship was shortened to 36 holes due to rain.
1Co-sanctioned by the Sunshine Tour

European Tour playoff record (1–0)

PGA EuroPro Tour wins (2)

Results in major championships

CUT = missed the half-way cut
"T" = tied

Results in World Golf Championships

"T" = Tied

Team appearances
Amateur
European Boys' Team Championship (representing Scotland): 2001
European Youths' Team Championship (representing Scotland): 2002, 2004 (winners)
Palmer Cup (representing Europe): 2005
Eisenhower Trophy (representing Scotland): 2006

Professional
Seve Trophy (representing Great Britain & Ireland): 2011 (winners), 2013

See also
2010 Challenge Tour graduates

References

External links

Scottish male golfers
European Tour golfers
Augusta Jaguars men's golfers
Golfers from Glasgow
1983 births
Living people